The African U-17 Cup of Nations for Women is association football tournament for the under 17 teams, that is held every two years, and serves as a qualifying competition for the FIFA U-17 Women's World Cup.

The next edition is planned for 2022.

History
The tournament was first held in 2008 with 12 teams entering the tournament, but five withdrew before playing. Nigeria and Ghana qualified for the world cup. In 2010, ten teams entered but only five played matches: Nigeria, Ghana and South Africa qualified to the World Cup.

Results

African U-17 Women's Championship

 A round-robin tournament determined the final standings.

African U-17 Women's World Cup Qualifying Tournament

Results at the World Cup
All editions have qualified three teams to the FIFA U-17 Women's World Cup. Ghana has been the only team to win in the quarter-finals of this tournament, placing 3rd in 2012. Nigeria has reached the quarter-final for three times. All other CAF teams have been eliminated in the group stages.

QF = World Cup quarter-final
GS = World Cup group stage

q = Qualified to world cup
3rd = World Cup third Place

Teams participating

1 Congo did not show up for the first leg in the first round.

Legend

 — Champions
 — Runners-up
 — Third place
 — Fourth place
 — Qualified for FIFA WC
PR — Preliminary Round
R1 — Round 1

R2 — Round 2
 — Withdrew
 — Did not enter
 — Hosts
q — Qualified for upcoming tournament

See also 
Africa Women Cup of Nations
African U-20 Women's World Cup qualification

References

External links 
Official website
African Women U-17 World Cup Qualifying - rsssf.com

 
Confederation of African Football competitions for women's national teams
Recurring sporting events established in 2008
Under-17 association football